Walvis Bay Commando was a light infantry regiment of the South African Army. It formed part of the South African Army Infantry Formation as well as the South African Territorial Reserve.

History

Origin

Operations

With the SADF
During this era, the unit was mainly involved in area force protection, cordones and search operations assisting the local police and stock theft control.

Disbandment
This unit with any remaining South African units left in Namibia by 1994 was disbanded  after the enclave of Walvis Bay was handed over to the new Namibian government. This followed bilateral discussions and a transitional Joint Administrative Authority to administer the territory.

Unit Insignia

Leadership

References

See also 
 South African Commando System

Infantry regiments of South Africa
South African Commando Units